Dolf de Vries (11 July 1937 – 5 December 2020) was a Dutch actor from The Hague.

De Vries was best known for his television appearances, especially for his role as Verhulst in Dossier Verhulst (1986–87). He also appeared in several of Paul Verhoeven's best-known films, such as Black Book and Soldier of Orange.

In his spare time he wrote plays and travel books. He died, aged 83, at his home in The Hague.

Filmography

References

External links

1937 births
2020 deaths
Dutch male film actors
Dutch male television actors
Male actors from The Hague
20th-century Dutch people